EPC may refer to:

Government and politics 
 Eastern Provincial Council, in Sri Lanka
 European Policy Centre, a Belgian think tank
 European Political Community (1952), a former political organization proposed in 1952
 European Political Community (2022), a new initiative pioneered by Emmanuel Macron
 European Political Cooperation, a form of European Union foreign policy coordination

Law 
 Equal Protection Clause, of the Fourteenth Amendment to the United States Constitution
 European Patent Convention, a multilateral treaty based on which European patents are granted

Science and technology 
 Asus Eee PC, a line of netbook computers
 Early Prostate Cancer programme, a clinical programme of bicalutamide monotherapy for prostate cancer
Electronic Parts Catalogue
 Electronic Product Code
 Endothelial progenitor cell
 Energy Performance Certificate
 × Epicattleya, an orchid genus
 Evolved Packet Core, part of the System Architecture Evolution, in telecommunications
 Extra-pair copulation

Other uses 
 EPC (EP), by Battles
 Edgewell Personal Care, an American manufacturing company
 Electronic Poetry Center, an online resource for digital poetry
 Engineering, procurement, and construction
 EPC Group, a German engineering and construction company
 EPC Groupe, a French explosives company
 European Paralympic Committee
 European Payments Council, a banking organization
 Evangelical Presbyterian Church (disambiguation)
 Event-driven process chain, a type of flow chart for business process modeling
 Export Promotion Council, a Kenyan trade group
 Class designation for Reading electric multiple units
 Execution Phase Contracts, see Front-end engineering